Kyle O'Sullivan  is an Irish diplomat who is currently serving as the Irish ambassador to Israel.

Early life and education
O'Sullivan was born and educated. O'Sullivan was born in Dublin, Ireland.  He was educated at Trinity College Dublin and University College Dublin.

Career
O'Sullivan joined the Department of Foreign Affairs in 1993 after working for some years in Hong Kong. Before becoming ambassador to Israel served  as Consular Director at the Department of Foreign Affairs and Trade in Dublin. Before that he held two ambassadorial postings in Nigeria and Indonesia and a period as Director for EU Policy in the office of the Taoiseach (Prime Minister). He has also served in other posts at home and abroad.

Ambassador to Nigeria
O'Sullivan served as Ireland's ambassador to Nigeria from 2007 to 2010.

Ambassador to Indonesia
O'Sullivan became Ireland's first ambassador to Indonesias in 2014 and served there until 2018 when he was succeeded by Olivia Leslie. O'Sullivan was ambassador to Indonesia when an earthquake struck in 2018. All of the Irish people caught up in the earthquake, over 50 in total, were accounted for.

Ambassador to Israel
In 2019 O'Sullivan became Ireland's ambassador to Israel, replacing Alison Kelly, who retired from government service. He presented his credentials to Israel's president, Reuven Rivlin, on Wednesday, August 7, 2019.

References

External links
 Embassy of Ireland in Israel

Living people
21st-century diplomats
Ambassadors of Ireland to Israel
Ambassadors of Ireland to Indonesia
Ambassadors of Ireland to Nigeria
Alumni of Trinity College Dublin
Diplomats from Dublin (city)
20th-century Irish people
21st-century Irish people
1953 births